Lavanya Sundararaman is a Carnatic musician. She received initial training from Poornapragya Rao, and went on to receive further training from her family of musicians.

Early life and family
Lavanya was born to Gayathri and Dr. R. Sundararaman. She is the great-granddaughter of the prominent Carnatic music vocalist, D. K. Pattammal. She is also the great-granddaughter of Palghat Mani Iyer, who was a mridangam maestro.

Lavanya received music lessons during her childhood from her great-grandmother D. K. Pattammal. She is a disciple of her grandmother and noted singer Lalitha Sivakumar, her mother Gayathri Sundararaman, and is a niece and disciple of renowned singer Nithyasree Mahadevan.

Lavanya has completed her post-graduate and undergraduate studies in Music at Queen Mary's College, Chennai and is pursuing her Ph.D. in Music under the guidance of Dr. M. A. Bhageerathi.

Musical career

Touring
Lavanya has performed at major sabhas in India, particularly during the annual December music festival in Chennai. She has also presented songs and concerts in the United States of America, Canada, Sri Lanka, and other destinations.

Notable performances by Lavanya have included:
 Concert with great-grandmother D. K. Pattammal, grandmother Lalitha Sivakumar, grandfather I. Sivakumar, and aunt Nithyasree Mahadevan at the Madras Music Academy in September 2000.
 Thematic concert for Mangalam Ganapathy Trust in February 2008.
 Concerts with aunt Nithyasree Mahadevan entitled Triveni Sangamam and Vellithirai Ragangal featuring Film songs in 2009.   
 Concert with grandmother Lalitha Sivakumar and aunt Nithyasree Mahadevan in tribute to great-grandmother D. K. Pattammal in 2010 to conclude 25th anniversary celebration for Youth Association for Carnatic Music.   
 Concerts in Mumbai in July 2011.

Television works
Lavanya has appeared in various television music programs to perform, including:

  The Ragamalika music show on Jaya TV in 2004 for a special Tamil New Year program.
  A special Diwali program telecast in 2009 on Raj TV.
  Season 2 of Airtel Super Singer Junior for their Karthigai Special program in November 2009 on Vijay TV.
  The Theanamudhu music program on Makkal TV telecast in India in 2013, 2014 and 2015.
  Navarathiri Nayagiyar special music program telecast on Jaya TV during the Navarathri Festival in the year 2015

Discography
Lavanya has sung songs in Hindu devotional and other-genre music albums, including: 
  Sai Lavanya Lahari for Sri Sathya Sai Sadhana Trust, Prashanthinilayam, Puttaparthi.
   Karunai Deivame for Giri Trading Agency.
   Madurakali Amman for Mangalam Ganapathy Trust.
  Triveni Sangamam DVD for Giri Trading Agency.

Titles, awards, and recognition

References

Singers from Chennai
Living people
Performers of Hindu music
Indian women classical singers
Women Carnatic singers
Carnatic singers
1992 births
Women musicians from Tamil Nadu
21st-century Indian singers
21st-century Indian women singers